The Archaeological Museum of Milos is a museum, in Plaka, Milos on Milos, in Greece. Its collections include exhibits dating from the late Neolithic to the Byzantine period. The unique is collection of ancient Cycladic art, especially numerous findings from Phylakopi on Milos, from early Bronze Age to the late Bronze Age. The best pieces from Phylakopi are in the Ashmolean Museum (Oxford), in the British Museum and in the National Museum of Athens and elsewhere around the world.

The museum is housed since 1985 in a neo-classical building dating from 1870 on the main square in Plaka. In the porch of the building and on the courtyard is lapidary with torsos from the late antiquity.

Room 1 
The first room hosts large pottery vessels since the late Bronze Age to the Greek archaic period, a modern copy of the statue of Venus de Milo and a collection of obsidian tools from Neolithic to early Bronze Age.

Room 2 
The main museum treasures: The Bronze Age on Milos: Early Cycladic, Minoan and Mycenaean artefacts from Phylakopi and from other places of the island.

Room 3 
Ancient Greek pottery.

Room 4 
Ancient Greek and Roman sculptures. Ancient Greek inscriptions in the local version of the alphabet.

External links

 Hellenic Ministry of Culture and Tourism

Milos
Milos